Tit Kan (also Romanized as Tīt Kan; also known as Tītagīn, Tī Takīn, Tītgīn, and Tītkīn) is a village in Gabrik Rural District, in the Central District of Jask County, Hormozgan Province, Iran. At the 2006 census, its population was 85, in 16 families.

References 

Populated places in Jask County